Khoshkehdar-e Malmir (also Romanized as Khoshkehdar-e Mālmīr; also known as Khoshgehdar, Khoshkdar-e Bālā, Khoshkeh Dar, and Khoshkehdar) is a village in Malmir Rural District, Sarband District, Shazand County, Markazi Province, Iran. At the 2006 census, its population was 205, in 53 families.

References 

Populated places in Shazand County